The UK Dance Chart is a chart that ranks the biggest-selling singles that are released through the genre of Dance in the United Kingdom. The chart is compiled by the Official Charts Company, and is based on both physical and digital single sales. The dates listed in the menus below represent the Saturday after the Sunday the chart was announced, as per the way the dates are given in chart publications such as the ones produced by Billboard, Guinness, and Virgin.

Number-ones

 – the single was simultaneously number-one on the UK Singles Chart during this chart week.

See also

List of number-one singles of 2010 (UK)
List of UK Dance Chart number-one albums of 2010
List of UK Official Download Chart number-one singles of 2010
List of UK Indie Chart number-one singles of 2010
List of UK Rock Chart number-one singles of 2010
List of UK R&B Chart number-one singles of 2010

References

External links
Dance Singles Top 40 at the Official Charts Company
UK Top 40 Dance Singles at BBC Radio 1

Number-one dance hits
UK Dance Singles
2010